Panaeolopsis is a genus of fungi in the family Agaricaceae. The genus has a widespread distribution and contains four species. Panaeolopsis was circumscribed by Rolf Singer in 1969 with P. sanmartiniana as the type species.

See also
List of Agaricaceae genera
List of Agaricales genera

References

External links
 Mushroom Observer — Panaeolopsis

Agaricaceae
Agaricales genera
Taxa named by Rolf Singer